Anthony Hyman (1946–1999) was a British writer, broadcaster, and Middle East expert.

Anthony Hyman may also refer to:

 Anthony A. Hyman (born 1962), British biologist
 R. Anthony Hyman (born 1928), British historian of science writer

See also
 Anthony Hamann